Angelo Longoni (17 January 1933 – 17 June 1993) was an Italian footballer who played as a midfielder.

INFO

Ciccio Longoni played mostly as left winger, but sometimes also operated on the right side. Longoni was small and stocky player, very fast and astute but technically not on high level. Often irresistible with good pace and sudden wriggles, he was very dangerous. Ciccio had strong shot even two-footed, also knew to send good cross from the wing. Longoni grew up in Lecco footballing team in their city, was bought by AC Milan just 17 years, the society in which, however, had no way to shine. Its explosion occurred with the transfer of Atalanta, which competed with the signing almost 200 games 38 goals, managing to earn a call-up, increases in boys and made his debut for Milan in Serie A to 19 years but was too minute to play with the famous Gre-No-Li and was sent to the province. So it was that in 20 years arrives Atalanta and stayed there for 7 years before moving to Lazio. He played a game for the national team alongside Boniperti, Muccinelli and Montuori. The game in question was that of 9 December 1956 against Austria, in which he scored two goals in the victory (2-1), although this exploit was never called into the senior national team. The game in question was that of 9 December 1956 against Austria, in which he scored two goals in the victory despite this exploit was never called into the senior national team. After seven seasons with the jacket of neroazzurri was sold to Lazio, afterwards moved to Vis Pesaro in the first series, then C, concluding his career in Serie B in the ranks of Lecco. He was later a coach in Series C and Series D, training among others on Lecco, Croton, the Giulianova and Marsala. Angelo Longoni died in 1993.

Club career
Longoni played for several clubs, including Lecco, A.C. Milan, Atalanta, Lazio  and Vis Pesaro.

International career
Longoni played his one and only game for Italy in 1956, scoring two goals.

External links
 
 

1933 births
1983 deaths
Italian footballers
Italy international footballers
S.S. Lazio players
Calcio Lecco 1912 players
A.C. Milan players
Atalanta B.C. players
Association football midfielders